Dunbar Township is a township in Fayette County, Pennsylvania, United States. The population was 6,664 at the 2020 census, a decline from the figure of 7,126 tabulated in 2010.

Dunbar Township includes the unincorporated communities of Dickerson Run, Liberty, Adelaide, Crossland, Juniata, Little Summit, Graham Crossing, Leisenring, Rogerstown, Trotter, Greenwood Heights, Wheeler, Fayette, Sitka, Bowest, Monarch, Mahoning, Hill Farm, Ferguson, Pechin, Brown Row, Hardy Hill, Factory Hill, Furnace Hill, and Irishtown.

History
The Isaac Meason House was designated a National Historic Landmark in 1971.

Geography
Dunbar Township is in north-central Fayette County. It is bordered to the north and east by the Youghiogheny River, except where it touches the city of Connellsville. The township surrounds the boroughs of Dunbar (near the township center) and Vanderbilt (in the northwest). Across the Youghiogheny, the township is bordered by the borough of South Connellsville to the northeast and by the borough of Dawson to the north.

U.S. Route 119 crosses the township, leading northeast to Connellsville and southwest to Uniontown, the Fayette County seat.

Demographics

As of the census of 2000, there were 7,562 people, 2,944 households, and 2,140 families residing in the township.  The population density was 128.0 people per square mile (49.4/km).  There were 3,152 housing units at an average density of 53.3/sq mi (20.6/km).  The racial makeup of the township was 97.57% White, 1.52% African American, 0.12% Native American, 0.21% Asian, 0.04% from other races, and 0.54% from two or more races. Hispanic or Latino of any race were 0.32% of the population.

There were 2,944 households, out of which 30.1% had children under the age of 18 living with them, 56.8% were married couples living together, 11.0% had a female householder with no husband present, and 27.3% were non-families. 23.8% of all households were made up of individuals, and 11.1% had someone living alone who was 65 years of age or older.  The average household size was 2.53 and the average family size was 3.00.

In the township the population was spread out, with 23.0% under the age of 18, 7.7% from 18 to 24, 28.0% from 25 to 44, 25.6% from 45 to 64, and 15.7% who were 65 years of age or older.  The median age was 40 years. For every 100 females, there were 97.4 males.  For every 100 females age 18 and over, there were 91.5 males.

The median income for a household in the township was $31,951, and the median income for a family was $38,438. Males had a median income of $29,516 versus $20,670 for females. The per capita income for the township was $15,083.  About 8.7% of families and 13.1% of the population were below the poverty line, including 15.1% of those under age 18 and 14.2% of those age 65 or over.

References 

Pittsburgh metropolitan area
Townships in Fayette County, Pennsylvania
Townships in Pennsylvania